The Division is an American police procedural drama television series created by Deborah Joy LeVine starring Bonnie Bedelia. The series focuses on a team of female detectives and police officers in the San Francisco Police Department. The series premiered on Lifetime on January 7, 2001 and ended on June 28, 2004 after 88 episodes.

Overview
The show focused on the lives of five policewomen in the felony division headed by Captain Kate McCafferty (Bonnie Bedelia). Storylines revolved around the women's personal and professional lives, and their attempts to balance both. The series tackled such topics as alcoholism, drug addiction, homophobia, and sexual abuse.

The series premiered on January 7, 2001, earning a 3.1 rating and the "largest audience of any basic cable original series" that year. After four seasons, the show was canceled on June 28, 2004. It was the network's second "longest-running scripted series".

After its cancellation, The Division was rebroadcast on the Lifetime network in various timeslots until 2007. In 2008, reruns aired on Lifetime Real Women. Starting in September 2018, the broadcast syndication became available on Start TV.

Cast and characters

Main

 Captain Kaitlyn "Kate" McCafferty is the commanding officer of SFPD's Felony Division and mother to a teenage daughter.
 Inspector Jinny Exstead comes from a police family and often bends the rules, which puts her at odds with Captain McCafferty.
 Inspector Candace "C. D." DeLorenzo has some past demons. She resigns in-between seasons 3 and 4 after being shot in the line of duty.
 Inspector Magdalena "Magda" Ramirez is a single mother of a young son. She is close friends with her partner Jinny Exstead.
 Inspector Angela Reid is a sassy no-nonsense investigator. She leaves the Division at the end of the first season.
 Inspector Peter Torianno is DeLorenzo's first partner. He leaves the Division halfway through of the first season.
 Inspector Nate Basso is DeLorenzo's second partner, arriving at the Division in the second season. Following her departure at the end of the third season, Basso is then partnered with Raina Washington.
 Officer/Inspector Raina Washington is a new member of the Division, arriving in the second season after Reid's transfer. In the third season, she is promoted to Inspector, and is later partnered with Basso in the final season.
 Officer Stacy Reynolds, a new officer hired in the final season by McCafferty to be her police services aid.

Recurring
 Jose Yenque as Gabriel 'Gabe' Herrera (2001–04) 
 Jacob Urrutia as Benjamin Ramirez (2001–04) 
 Alex Rocco as John Exstead Sr. (2001–04) 
 Allen Cutler as Casey Exstead (2001–04) 
 Scott Plank as John Exstead Jr. (2001–02) 
 Tanya Vidal as Lily Ramirez (2001–03) 
 Jay Harrington as Theodore Blumenthal (2001–02) 
 Michael MacRae as Steven (2001) 
 D. B. Woodside as Daniel Reide (2001) 
 Morgan Brayton as Amanda McCafferty (2001) 
 James Avery as Charles Haysbert (2002–03) 
 Troy Evans as Dusty (2002–03) 
 Robin Thomas as Louis Perillo (2002–04) 
 Lauren Tom as Nora Chen (2002) 
 Dean Cain as Insp. Jack Ellis (2003-2004) 
 Linda Gehringer as Dolores (2003–04) 
 David Sutcliffe as Dr. Michaelson/Jonah (2003) 
 Jon Tenney as Hank Riley (2004)

Guest

 Peter Coyote as Ross (2002)
 Sara Rue as Amanda McCafferty (2002–03)
 Paige Hurd as Chloe Newland (2003)
 Daniel Morton as Detective Lawson (2003) (uncredited)
 Roma Downey as Reagan Gilancy (2004)
 Kim Fields as Principal Ogden (2004)
 Rebecca Gayheart as Suzanne Richland (2004)
 Nia Peeples as Sandra Prestiss (2004)
 Zachary Levi as Todd (2004)

Episodes

Season 1 (2001)

Season 2 (2002)

Season 3 (2003)

Season 4 (2004)

Home media
The DVD set containing all four seasons including the pilot was released by Visual Entertainment in Region 1 on March 19, 2018.

Awards and nominations
Gracie Allen Awards
 Won: Outstanding Entertainment Program Drama (2004, Tied with "Without a Trace")

Imagen Foundation Awards
 Nominated: Best Actress in a Television Drama, Lisa Vidal (2004)

ALMA Awards
 Nominated: Outstanding Actress in a Television Series, Lisa Vidal (2002)

BMI Film & TV Awards
 Won: BMI Cable Award, Jeff Eden Fair (2004)
 Won: BMI Cable Award, Starr Parodi  (2004)
 Won: BMI Cable Award, Jeff Eden Fair (2003)
 Won: BMI Cable Award, Starr Parodi  (2003)

Young Artist Awards
 Nominated: Best Performance in a TV Drama Series - Guest Starring Young Actress, Joy Lauren (2003)
 Nominated: Best Performance in a TV Drama Series - Guest Starring Young Actor, Shawn Pyfrom (2002)

PRISM Awards
 Won: TV Drama Series Episode (2002, For the episode "Intervention")
 Nominated: Performance in a Drama Series Episode, Nancy McKeon (2003)
 Nominated: Performance in a Drama Series, Nancy McKeon (2003)
 Nominated: Performance in a Drama Series Multi Episode Storyline, Nancy McKeon (2004)

See also
 List of police television dramas

References

External links
  
 
 

2001 American television series debuts
2004 American television series endings
2000s American crime drama television series
2000s American police procedural television series
American detective television series
English-language television shows
Fictional portrayals of the San Francisco Police Department
Television shows set in San Francisco
Television series by CBS Studios
Lifetime (TV network) original programming